Dennis P. Gallon is an American academic. Gallon graduated with a Bachelor's degree in Business from Edward Waters College. He received a Master's degree from Indiana University in business. He went on to complete his Doctorate in Higher Education Administration from the University of Florida. In 1997 he was selected to be President of Palm Beach State College, then referred to as Palm Beach Community College, He has since retired. Prior to that appointment, Gallon had been President of Florida Community College at Jacksonville; Kent-Campus.

See also 
 Palm Beach State College
 Florida College System

References

External links 
 Gallon's Official bio
 A message from President Gallon
 

Living people
University of Florida alumni
Indiana University alumni
Edward Waters College alumni
African-American academics
Year of birth missing (living people)
Palm Beach State College people
21st-century African-American people